Nathan Aspinall (born 15 July 1991) is an English professional darts player currently playing in Professional Darts Corporation (PDC) events. He won the 2019 UK Open with a 170 checkout in the final leg against former World Champion Rob Cross.

Career
Aspinall began playing in PDC Development and Challenge Tour events in 2012. His first semi-final in those came in 2013, where he lost 4–2 to Max Hopp. He won a two-year PDC Tour Card in 2015 through the Q School Order of Merit and qualified for the UK Open, where he beat Chris Dobey 5–1 and James Richardson 9–4, before losing 4–9 to James Wade in the fourth round. Aspinall's first European Tour appearance was at the Dutch Darts Masters and he squeezed past Jamie Robinson and Vincent van der Voort both 6–5. In the third round Justin Pipe eliminated him 6–4. Aspinall won the seventh Development Tour event of 2015 with a 4–2 victory over Benito van de Pas. He also lost in the final of two other events during the year.
Aspinall made his first televised appearance in the final of the 2015 PDC World Youth Championship, where he played the German Max Hopp. After 10 legs of holding throw, the final deciding leg was thrown by Aspinall, and despite having match darts, it was Hopp who won 6–5.

2016
Aspinall was beaten 6–5 by Stuart Kellett in the second round of the 2016 UK Open. At the sixth Players Championship he reached his first quarter-final on the main tour and narrowly lost 6–5 against Vincent van der Voort. Aspinall qualified for his first Grand Slam of Darts, but could not get a win out of his group fixtures with Raymond van Barneveld, Mensur Suljović and Danny Noppert to finish bottom of his group.

2018
Aspinall won his first ranking PDC title in September 2018, beating Ryan Searle 6–4 in the final of the 18th Players Championship of the year, in Barnsley. This victory helped him qualify for his first world championship.

2019
At the 2019 World Championship. At the championship, Aspinall, a 500/1 outsider before the tournament, defeated world number six Gerwyn Price, Kyle Anderson, Devon Petersen and Brendan Dolan on his way to the semi-finals, where he lost 6–3 to Michael Smith.

Following Gary Anderson's withdrawal from the 2019 Premier League, Aspinall was selected as one of nine 'contenders' to replace him. He would play a one-off match against Michael Smith on night six in Nottingham.

Aspinall won his first PDC major at the 2019 UK Open, defeating Toni Alcinas, Christian Kist, Madars Razma, Steve Lennon, Ross Smith and Gerwyn Price to reach the final, where he defeated Rob Cross 11–5 to take the title, securing the final leg with a 170 checkout. The win took Aspinall into the top 16 of the PDC Order of Merit for the first time in his career.

Aspinall won the 2019 US Darts Masters, the first event on the 2019 World Series of Darts. It was Aspinall's first World Series event, and the only one he was selected to compete in during the 2019 edition. Aspinall averaged 107 in defeating Michael Smith 8-4 in the final. In the previous rounds, he beat Shawn Brenneman, Rob Cross, and Peter Wright. Aspinall won £20,000, and the win was only his second televised tournament win, after the 2019 UK Open.

He played in the 2019 World Matchplay for the first time, losing to Mervyn King 10-5 despite averaging 103, and he was also seeded, made him the first player to make his World Matchplay debut as a seed since Simon Whitlock in 2010.

2020
At the 2020 World Championship Aspinall once again reached the semi finals, beating Gary Anderson en route. He eventually fell to defending champion Michael van Gerwen.

2021 
At the 2021 World Championship, Aspinall beat Scott Waites 3–2 in the second round before losing 4–2 in the third round to Vincent van der Voort.

2022 
At the 2022 World Championship, Aspinall was whitewashed 4–0 in the third round by Callan Rydz.

At the World Grand Prix in October, Aspinall reached the final, where despite briefly rallying from 4–0 down, he finally succumbed 5–3 to Michael van Gerwen.

He also reached the final of the Grand Slam of Darts in November, losing 16–5 to Michael Smith, who won his first major title.

2023 
At the 2023 World Championship, Aspinall lost 4–3 in the third round to Josh Rock.

World Championship results

PDC
 2019: Semi-finals (lost to Michael Smith 3–6)
 2020: Semi-finals (lost to Michael van Gerwen 3–6)
 2021: Third round (lost to Vincent van der Voort 2–4)
 2022: Third round (lost to Callan Rydz 0–4)
 2023: Third round (lost to Josh Rock 3–4)

Career finals

PDC major finals: 4 (1 titles, 3 runners-up)

PDC World Series finals: 1 (1 title)

Performance timeline

PDC European Tour

References

External links

1991 births
Living people
English darts players
Professional Darts Corporation current tour card holders
World Series of Darts winners
UK Open champions
Sportspeople from Stockport